Tiara Yachts is a boat manufacturer based in Holland, Michigan. Its models include both fishing and cruising yachts ranging from 34–53 feet. The company is most famous for coining the term "open" to describe its Tiara 3100. Tiara had a sister company, known as Pursuit, that produces models from 24–42 feet with outboard engines. Pursuit Boats was acquired by Malibu Boats in 2018.

History of company
Tiara Yachts is known for building mid-sized luxury yachts.
The company’s founder, Leon Slikkers, owned and operated another yacht building company before he founded his second company, S2 Yachts (parent company to Tiara). Even before that, Slikkers worked at Chris Craft. Slikkers' next move in his career was owning and operating Slickcraft, which focused on building motor-powered boats. In the late 1960s, many large public yacht companies were looking to buy smaller companies in the interest of drawing new stockholders and diversifying their stock. A company based in New York, called American Machine and Foundry (AMF), gained interest in Slickcraft. In the September of 1969, Slikkers sold the company, while still holding his position as President. After a few years with this new company, Slikkers left, claiming that they were not committed to the same level of excellence as he was. Slikkers then proceeded to leave AMF and Slickcraft behind to create a new company with his sons, which his family stills owns and operates today, S2 Yachts and all of its ‘child’ companies such as Tiara Yachts.

On February 18, 1974, S2 Yachts was founded. Shortly after S2 Yachts was founded, Slikkers’ two older sons finished college and joined their father at the company. S2 began rolling sailboats off the lot almost right away, however, a few more years down the line Leon began to feel the same pressure as before. Fortunately for him, he had a larger company this time, more capital than before, and both his sons on his side. All these factors allowed S2 to gain momentum in the ever-competitive industry, still able to remain a private company. In 1976, Leon decided that it was time for another change of pace within the company. These changes lead to S2 Yachts building motor yachts. As a result of the high sales of this new line of yachts, it was decided to create a totally new division in the company that would focus on motor yachts only. Tiara Yachts was incorporated.

Tiara Yachts are manufactured in Tiara’s Holland Michigan plant. Tiara previously had a manufacturing plant in South Carolina but this was closed during the 2008-2009 US economic downturn and all manufacturing was returned to Holland Michigan.

Yachts offered by Tiara
Tiara Yachts currently offers five series of yachts, the Q Series, Tiara Series, Convertible Series, Flybridge Series, and Coupe Series.

Previously, Tiara Yachts made the Sport, Open, Coronet, Express, Convertible, and Sovran series.

The largest yacht Tiara made by length was the 52 Express at just over 62 feet in LOA (length over all).  The largest by model name was the 58 Sovran. Neither is currently made.  The smallest model made was the 2400 Sport.

Q Series
The Q Series is currently available in a single model, the Q 44. The Q Series is marketed as an "adventure yacht" for day boating.

Tiara Series
The Tiara Series is available in four models: 31, 36, 39, and 43. The Tiara Series is designed as an open coupe for day boating.

Convertible
The Convertible Series is available in two models, the 39 Convertible and 48 Convertible. The Convertible Series is designed as a sport fishing and/or cruising yacht.

Flybridge
The Flybridge Series is available in two models, the F 44 and F 53. The Flybridge Series is the flybridge version of the Coupe Series.

Coupe
The Coupe Series is available in three models, the C 39, C 44, and C 53. The Coupe Series is designed as a cruising yacht.

References

External links
 

Companies based in Michigan